The Tribes and Castes of Bengal is a book written by Herbert Hope Risley in 1891. There were four volumes, some of which have been digitized by Google, which are available from the Harvard Library.

References

External links 
 The book at Archive.org

19th-century Indian books
Anthropology books
English-language books
Social class in India